Skruv is a locality situated in Lessebo Municipality, Kronoberg County, Sweden with 490 inhabitants in 2010.

References 

Populated places in Kronoberg County
Populated places in Lessebo Municipality
Värend